Chipman Creek may refer to:
Chipman Creek (Alberta), a stream in Alberta, Canada
Chipman Creek (British Columbia), a stream in British Columbia, Canada

See also
Chapman Creek, a stream in Pennsylvania, United States